"Life has become better" is a widespread version of a phrase uttered by former Soviet Communist Party General Secretary Joseph Stalin at the First All-Union Meeting of the Stakhanovites on November 17, 1935. The full quote from Joseph Stalin was, when translated into English,

Song 
In approximately 1936 the words were used in the chorus of a song of the same name, with music by Alexander Alexandrov and words by Vasily Lebedev-Kumach. The opening bars of the song and some sequences share a notable resemblance to those of the State Anthem of the Soviet Union, as the two songs had the same composer, and elements of the song "Life Has Become Better" were used in composing the State Anthem. 

Alexandrov apparently liked the opening bars of this piece. He used them again, with only minor alterations, just a few years later in the tune for the "State Anthem of the Soviet Union" (1944-1991).  The Russian Duma officially readopted the Aleksandrov's Soviet Anthem as the National anthem of Russia on December 2000, as part of a political compromise.  New words were written by Sergey Mikhalkov.

Lyrics

See also 
State Anthem of the Soviet Union
Hymn of the Bolshevik Party
National Anthem of Russia

References

Russian words and phrases
Soviet phraseology
Propaganda in the Soviet Union
1935 in the Soviet Union
Joseph Stalin
Soviet songs
Russian patriotic songs
1930s neologisms